The 2017–18 Namibia Premier League is the 28th season of top-tier football in Namibia. It returned after not being played in 2016–17. The season started on 20 October 2017 and finished on 6 May 2018.

Standings
Final table.

See also
2018 Namibia FA Cup

References

Namibia
Seasons in Namibian football leagues
Prem
Prem